The 1969–70 Northern Rugby Football League season was the 75th season of rugby league football in Britain.

Rule change
 Tactical substitutions were now allowed to occur after half time during a game, they had been permitted before half time since 1964.

Season summary

Leeds had ended the regular season as league leaders for the fourth successive season. St. Helens won their fifth Rugby Football League Championship when they beat Leeds 24-12 in the final. Frank Myler was awarded the Harry Sunderland Trophy as man-of-the-match.

The Challenge Cup winners were Castleford who beat Wigan 7-2 in the final.

The BBC2 Floodlit Trophy winners were Leigh who beat Wigan 11-6 in the final.

Wigan won the Lancashire League, and Leeds won the Yorkshire League, to date this was the last season in which the Lancashire League and Yorkshire League titles were awarded, other than a break between the 1902–03 and 1906–07 seasons, and breaks for World War I and World War II, the Lancashire League and Yorkshire League titles had been awarded since the inaugural rugby league season of 1895–96. Swinton beat Leigh 11–2 to win the Lancashire County Cup, and Hull F.C. beat Featherstone Rovers 12–9 to win the Yorkshire County Cup.

Championship

Play-offs

Challenge Cup

Castleford beat Wigan 7-2 in the final played at Wembley in front of a crowd of 95,255.

This was Castleford’s third Cup Final win in three Final appearances and their second in successive years. It was also the lowest winning score in a Challenge Cup Final at Wembley.

References

Sources
1969-70 Rugby Football League season at wigan.rlfans.com
The Challenge Cup at The Rugby Football League website

1969 in English rugby league
1970 in English rugby league
Northern Rugby Football League seasons